The 2021 Bass Pro Shops NRA Night Race was a NASCAR Cup Series race held on September 18, 2021 at Bristol Motor Speedway in Bristol, Tennessee. Contested over 500 laps on the  short track, it was the 29th race of the 2021 NASCAR Cup Series season, third race of the Playoffs and final race of the Round of 16.

The race was won by Kyle Larson. Tyler Reddick, Aric Almirola, Kurt Busch and Michael McDowell were eliminated from the round of 16.

Report

Background

The Bristol Motor Speedway, formerly known as Bristol International Raceway and Bristol Raceway, is a NASCAR short track venue located in Bristol, Tennessee. Constructed in 1960, it held its first NASCAR race on July 30, 1961. Despite its short length, Bristol is among the most popular tracks on the NASCAR schedule because of its distinct features, which include extraordinarily steep banking, an all concrete surface, two pit roads, and stadium-like seating. It has also been named one of the loudest NASCAR tracks.

Entry list
 (R) denotes rookie driver.
 (i) denotes driver who are ineligible for series driver points.

Qualifying
Martin Truex Jr. was awarded the pole for the race as determined by competition-based formula.

Starting Lineup

Race

Martin Truex Jr. earned the pole position for the start of the race, where he led the first five laps. Denny Hamlin won stage one after passing Kyle Larson on lap 90. A red flag occurred for nearly eight minutes following a turn 4 incident that involved four vehicles on lap 221. Larson led at the end of stage two. On lap 464, Chase Elliott was forced to pit from the lead when he had a flat tire from damage he received when Kevin Harvick got into his rear quarter panel. When back on the track, Elliott attempted to retaliate by getting into the side of then race leader Harvick and then running Harvick's preferred line, thus slowing him down. Larson was able to pass Harvick on lap 497, and secure his 12th overall Cup Series win. Following the race, Harvick and Elliott bumped cars on pit road and confronted each other when they eventually parked. Elliott said, "It's something [Harvick] does all the time. He runs into your left side constantly at other tracks and sometimes it does cut down your left side (tires), other times it doesn't." The argument continued for several minutes continuing inside Elliott's hauler. Michael McDowell, Kurt Busch, Tyler Reddick, and Aric Almirola were eliminated from the Playoffs.

Stage Results

Stage One
Laps: 125

Stage Two
Laps: 125

Final Stage Results

Stage Three
Laps: 250

Race statistics
 Lead changes: 23 among 7 different drivers
 Cautions/Laps: 8 for 71
 Red flags: 1 for 7 minutes and 53 seconds
 Time of race: 3 hours, 2 minutes and 56 seconds
 Average speed:

Media

Television
NBC Sports covered the race on the television side. Rick Allen, 2008 Food City 500 winner Jeff Burton, Steve Letarte and Dale Earnhardt Jr. called the race from the broadcast booth. Dave Burns, Marty Snider and Dillon Welch handled the pit road duties from pit lane. Rutledge Wood handled the features from the track.

Radio
PRN had the radio call for the race, which was also simulcast on Sirius XM NASCAR Radio. Doug Rice and Mark Garrow called the race from the booth when the field races down the frontstretch. Rob Albright called the race when the field races down the backstretch. Brad Gillie, Brett McMillan, Alan Cavanna, and Wendy Venturini handled the duties on pit lane.

Standings after the race

Drivers' Championship standings

Manufacturers' Championship standings

Note: Only the first 16 positions are included for the driver standings.

References

Bass Pro Shops NRA Night Race
Bass Pro Shops NRA Night Race
Bass Pro Shops NRA Night Race
NASCAR races at Bristol Motor Speedway